The Diocese of Lubbock is a Latin Church ecclesiastical territory or diocese of the Catholic Church in Texas.  It was founded on June 25, 1983. The Diocese of Lubbock—encompassing 25 counties (Bailey, Borden, Cochran, Cottle, Crosby, Dawson, Dickins, Fisher, Floyd, Gaines, Garza, Hale, Haskell, Hockley, Jones, Kent, King, Lamb, Lubbock, Lynn, Motley, Scurry, Stonewall, Terry, and Yoakum) on the Llano Estacado and Rolling Plains of West Texas—and, as of the 2010 U.S. Census, contained 136,894 self-proclaimed Catholics (Latin and Eastern) who gather in 63 parishes. The Diocese of Lubbock is a suffragan diocese in the ecclesiastical province of the metropolitan Archdiocese of San Antonio.

History
The Diocese of Lubbock was founded on was founded on June 25, 1983. Prior, the area was part of the Diocese of Amarillo and the Diocese of San Angelo.

Bishops
The list of bishops of the diocese and their terms of service:
 Michael Jarboe Sheehan (1983–1993), appointed Archbishop of Santa Fe
 Plácido Rodriguez, C.M.F. (1994–2016)
 Robert Milner Coerver (since 2016)

Education

Secondary school
 Christ the King Cathedral School, Lubbock

Arms

See also

 Catholic Church by country
 Catholic Church in the United States
 Ecclesiastical Province of San Antonio
 Global organisation of the Catholic Church
 List of Roman Catholic archdioceses (by country and continent)
 List of Roman Catholic dioceses (alphabetical) (including archdioceses)
 List of Roman Catholic dioceses (structured view) (including archdioceses)
 List of the Catholic dioceses of the United States

References

External links
Roman Catholic Diocese of Lubbock Official Site

Roman Catholic Ecclesiastical Province of San Antonio
Christian organizations established in 1983
Lubbock
Lubbock
Organizations based in Lubbock, Texas